Mauritius (sometimes Mascus) appears as Dean of Armagh in 1238, the second recorded incumbent.

References

Deans of Armagh
13th-century Irish Roman Catholic priests